Free is the eighteenth studio album by American rock singer Iggy Pop, released by Caroline International and Loma Vista Recordings on September 6, 2019. It features contributions from Noveller and Leron Thomas, and the title track was released along with the album announcement. A music video for the album's second single, "James Bond", was released on August 14, 2019.

Background and recording
Iggy Pop described the album as "reflect[ing]" the exhaustion of post-tour life" as well as "uniquely somber and contemplative". He went on to say that after touring in support of Post Pop Depression, he felt "drained" and wanted to be "free", so the album "just kind of happened to me, and I let it happen". In an interview with Exclaim!, he elaborated: "I wanted to wiggle out of the frame of rock instrumentation that I'd gotten encased in over time. There's nothing wrong with it, but it wasn't what I felt at this time. I was interested in working with some fine musicians who broke out of the normal time and space." Pop also called it "an album in which other artists speak for me, but I lend my voice".

Pop first learned of Sarah Lipstate, who records under the name Noveller, and Leron Thomas while hosting his BBC Radio 6 Music show; he contacted them to express his appreciation, which eventually led to collaborations. In 2016, Pop invited Lipstate to open for him during the Post Pop Depression tour. Of Thomas, Pop said, "little by little, his stuff was knocking me out, and I really wanted to sing [on] his songs."

The track "We Are the People" features lyrics written by Lou Reed in 1970 but first published posthumously in 2018. The words "totally resonated" with Pop: "Like, 'wham', like 'pow'. It was the first poem in a book of lyrics and when I saw it, I thought, 'My God, this is the country today as I understand it, or at least one legitimate portrayal of the country today. It really spoke to me."

"Do Not Go Gentle into That Good Night" is a reading of the poem of the same name by Dylan Thomas. Pop had previously done a recording of the poem at the request of an advertising agency, who wanted it for a commercial; Pop provided a reading, but initially didn't think much of it. By the time of the recording of Free, Pop had grown to like it and decided to rerecord the poem and have Lipstate and Thomas improvise around it.

Critical reception

Free received generally positive reviews from critics. At Metacritic, which assigns a normalized rating out of 100 to reviews from critics, the album received an average score of 73, which indicates "generally favorable reviews", based on 18 reviews.

Live performance
Pop performed the entire album live for the first time on 10 October 2019 at La Gaîté Lyrique in Paris as part of the Arte Concert Festival 2019. He ended the concert performing four other songs: solo songs "Sister Midnight" and "The Endless Sea", "Chop Chop Chop" (a Sleaford Mods cover tentatively retitled "People! Places! Parties!") and "Death Trip" (an Iggy and the Stooges song).

Track listing

Personnel
 Iggy Pop – vocals
 Leron Thomas – trumpet (all tracks except 10), keyboards (tracks 2, 7 and 8)
 Noveller – guitar "guitarscape" (tracks 1, 9 and 10)
 Kenny Ruby – bass (tracks 3, 5, 6), piano (track 3), synthetizer (tracks 5 and 6)
 Tibo Brandalise – drums (tracks 3, 5 and 6)
 Grégoire Fauque – guitar (tracks 5 and 6)
 Aaron Nevezie – guitar, bass (tracks 2 and 7), keyboards (track 7)
 Chris Berry – drums (track 2)
 Thomas Glass – drums (track 4)
 Robin Sherman – bass (track 4)
 Ari Teitel – guitar (track 4)
 Faith Vern – vocals (track 4)
 Florian Pellissier – keyboards (track 6)
 Rangeard Mickael – mix and mastering

Charts

Weekly charts

Year-end charts

References

2019 albums
Iggy Pop albums
Loma Vista Recordings albums